Bianca Michelle Devins (October 2, 2001 – July 14, 2019) was an American teenager from Utica, New York, who was murdered by a male acquaintance, Brandon Andrew Clark, on July 14, 2019. Following a botched suicide attempt, Clark was charged with second-degree murder. He subsequently pleaded guilty to the murder and was sentenced to 25 years to life in prison.

Police reports stated that Devins and Clark were in an intimate relationship, although the two perceived the relationship differently. Devins's sister called Clark a close family friend, though Devins said in a chat log she did not remember his name and had to "search it up" in their Discord chat history before their meeting, whereas others feared he was exploitative. The murder allegedly took place after Clark witnessed Devins kissing another man.

Devins' murder received considerable attention from the press and social media. Initial reports were marred by misinformation. Photos of Devins' corpse were taken by Clark and shared widely online, sparking both mockery and sympathy. Social media companies' responses were subject to criticism, leading to the introduction of legislation. Commentators have discussed the unique nature of the crime and its relation to the structure of social media.

Background 
Bianca Michelle Devins (aged 17 upon her death) intended to study psychology at Mohawk Valley Community College in Utica. Her struggles with mental illness, specifically depression, anxiety, borderline personality disorder, and post-traumatic stress disorder, were a concern for her loved ones. She "had been in and out of the hospital receiving mental health treatment for much of her teen years". Having experienced feelings of isolation, she found refuge in online communities. According to Syracuse newspaper The Post-Standard, Devins had been dealing with online harassment by incels for at least two years.

The childhood of Brandon Andrew Clark (born October 6, 1997; 21 at the time he murdered Devins) was subject to dysfunction; he once witnessed his father hold his mother at knifepoint for several hours. Upon meeting Clark, Devins' mother, Kimberly Devins, said he "seemed very nice" and was "polite".

Relationship between Devins and Clark 
It is believed that Clark and Devins met on Instagram in April 2019, after he had begun following her on the social media platform. Police described their friendship as a "personally intimate one", but friends and family said otherwise. Devins told her mother that she had explained to Clark that she did not want to date him, though Kimberly thought that he still "wanted more". One of Devins' sisters called Clark a trusted family friend, but a friend of Devins feared that Clark was exploiting Devins sexually while the two were high. Reportedly, Clark would supply drugs to Devins to entice her to spend time with him.

Murder 
On July 13, 2019, Canadian singer Nicole Dollanganger was performing a show in New York City that was attended by Devins, Clark, and a friend of theirs named Alex. Following the show, Clark and Devins returned to Utica. The two engaged in an argument—likely regarding a kiss between Devins and Alex. Eventually, Clark began assaulting her, slicing her neck with a long knife hidden by his seat. Devins died in the early morning hours of July 14. Her body, nearly decapitated, was left in the car, as Clark built a bonfire and listened to the song "Test Drive" by Joji.

After Devins' death, Clark called numerous family members. His call resembled a suicide note, prompting his family to call 9-1-1. He posted photographs of Devins' body to a Discord server, accompanied by the caption: "sorry fuckers, you're going to have to find somebody else to orbit". Orbiting is the act of following a person online, requesting pictures to other users, and in some cases stalking. A video of the murder was also created. By 7:00am, Discord users had notified the police, who received "numerous" calls, including one from Clark, and made contact with Devins' family. In his call to the dispatcher, Clark said:"My name is Brandon, the victim is Bianca Michelle Devins, I'm not going to stay on the phone for long, because I still need to do the suicide part of the murder-suicide". At the police's arrival, Clark stabbed himself in the neck. He lay across a green tarp concealing Devins' body, and posted more photos online. A suicide note and message were found, the latter reading: "May you never forget me". The next day, police confirmed that the victim was Devins, and charged Clark with second-degree murder.

Having "had the knife and equipment to videotape the killing", authorities reported the possibility that he planned the murder. Police Sgt. Michael Curley believed Clark desired fame. Oneida County assistant district attorney Sarah DeMellier claimed that he gave various explanations for the killing to multiple people. He had made online searches on how to find the carotid artery, how to incapacitate or kill someone, and general searches for choking and hanging.

Reaction

Local 
A vigil for Devins was held on July 15; her funeral taking place on July 19. Another vigil was held in July 2020. On February 14, 2020, a fashion and art show displaying Devins' work was held. Week-long counseling sessions were offered to Thomas R. Proctor High School students. The Adirondack Bank Center at the Utica Memorial Auditorium was lit up in honor of Devins. Frank Williams, Devins' grandfather, thanked the Utica community for their support.

Social media 

The images of Devins' corpse became widely shared on social media such as Instagram, Facebook and Twitter. They gained traction on the website 4chan, with hundreds of posts praising Clark for committing "another 4chan murder". Users on Incels.co and 8chan were also celebratory. #ripbianca briefly trended on Twitter. Accounts promised to post images of Devins' murder in exchange for likes and follows, and illegitimate fundraising websites sprang up to capitalize on her name and death.

The initial online discussion of the murder was marred by misinformation and rumors were spread by users. Tweets from prominent Twitter users—one of which was shared over 16,000 times—falsely identified Clark as an incel. Speculation on the crime's nature was "rampant"; users on Twitter, YouTube and Reddit examined Devins' history and sought to explain the murder.

Dr. James Densley, a professor of criminal justice, said that the images could cause trauma in those who viewed them. Her stepfather—who suffered the most harassment—reported having flashbacks. Devins' sister, Olivia, detailed similar results. Kim said that "So many people have been affected by the pictures, scarred for life and suffering from PTSD, unable to erase the image from their mind". Nicole Dollanganger asked that people stop sharing the photos.

Company responses 
Instagram and Facebook removed Clark's account and attempted to stop the photos' spread. Facebook added images of the murder to a digital fingerprint database and blacklisted the hashtag #yesjuliet; the Discord server that Clark utilized was shut down. Users who attempted to report them on Instagram found that they were not considered violations of community guidelines. Instagram's response was met with criticism.

It was reported that some images stayed on Instagram for as long as four days; Devins' mother Kim claimed that by September the images could still be found on Facebook. Prosecutors in the trial said the images could still be found months later. Olivia reported that nearly two years later, the photos were still being sent to her. Hany Farid, a scholar of digital forensics and image analysis, claimed that Instagram and other companies had the tools to deal with the spread and that their inaction bordered on the criminal—despite a strictly legal perspective saying otherwise.

News reports and commentary 
By July 15, the story had reached the mainstream and was subsequently reported around the world—likely being the most publicized case of social media documenting a murder. Devins had only 2,000 followers prior to her death, but by July 15, her follower count had risen by 75,000. Initial reports of her murder overstated her online popularity based on the post-mortem number of followers.

Melissa Jeltsen of HuffPost recalled that in the immediate aftermath of Devins's death, "Everyone wanted [it] to mean something." The Post-Standard's Elizabeth Doran noted the case was more closely related to "the well-worn story... of abusive male partners". Queenie Wong of CNET and Densley found that the murder demonstrated the problems with how social media responds to violent imagery. The Internet's connection in the murder has been noted by many.

The crime has been discussed as a case of domestic violence against women caused by toxic masculinity. Misogyny was seen by some as relevant to the context of Devins's death. Evelyn Douek of Harvard University drew parallels between the sharing of photos of Devins to the sharing of videos related to the Christchurch shooting. Others have drawn similar conclusions regarding Christchurch, noting that both men repeated the meme "subscribe to PewDiePie" following the events.

Clark's actions following Devins' death have been interpreted as a demonstration of control, including by her mother. Director of criminology Alison Marganski said that Clark's behavior fit the profile of other violent male offenders and speculated that he felt emasculated and wanted to show his strength.

Aftermath

Sentencing 
Clark pleaded not guilty to second-degree murder on July 29, 2019. He was later charged with promoting prison contraband, after corrections officers found a shiv constructed out of a sharpened toothbrush in his cell. According to Kim, he composed a letter to a friend around this time which saw him "bragging" and noting how it felt to kill. This letter, reportedly, explained his motive: "he couldn't handle the thought of her walking out of his life".

On February 10, 2020, before his trial, Clark changed his plea to guilty. His sentencing was scheduled for April 7, but was delayed because of the COVID-19 pandemic. On June 2, he filed a notice to withdraw his guilty plea, claiming his lawyer had failed him. This was denied, as he had admitted  to his guilt. His hearing took place on September 30, and a written decision was drawn up on October 30. On March 16, 2021, Clark was sentenced to 25 years to life in prison. He has formally expressed remorse for his actions.

Legislation 
Kim Devins, alongside then congressman Anthony Brindisi, called for increased action to be taken by social media companies in regards to graphic content. Instagram reportedly promised to share the results of an audit, requested by Brindisi, by August 2019, although by December, Kim had yet to receive the results. Brindisi requested that the Federal Trade Commission investigate the case for full accountability.

On September 21, 2020, Brindisi and the Devins family introduced "Bianca's Law". If passed, all social media platforms with more than $10 million in revenue and over 100,000 monthly users would be required to establish an office dedicated to identifying and removing violent content that violates the platform's moderation standards. Marianne Buttenschon and Joseph Griffo introduced a law that would create criminal and civil penalties for spreading an image of a crime victim with the intent of glorification or harassment. In January 2022, the New York State Assembly passed a version of Bianca's Law, which criminalizes posting, sharing, or publishing personal images with intent to degrade or abuse under certain circumstances. It was signed into law by Governor Kathy Hochul at the end of December 2022.

The Devins family started a scholarship in Bianca's name for students pursuing psychology degrees. In early 2020, Bianca's friends and family held "The Bee Gala" to celebrate her life, showcase artwork she had made, and raise funds for the scholarship.

In July 2021, Devins's family sued the Oneida County District Attorney's Office, accusing them of distribution of child pornography. They had learned from producers of documentaries on the murder that they had received from the district attorney's office footage of Devins' death and of her having sex, as well the contents of her phone which included nude photos. Allegedly, a YouTube blogger was also given these in response to a FOIL request.

Notes

References 

2019 controversies
2019 crimes in New York (state)
2019 murders in the United States
Female murder victims
Violence against women in the United States
Deaths by stabbing in New York (state)
People murdered in New York (state)
Murdered American children
History of women in New York (state)
Filmed killings
Incidents of violence against girls
July 2019 crimes in the United States